Kaksha() is an Indian Telugu-language action film written and directed by V. C. Guhanathan in his Telugu cinema debut starring Sobhan Babu, Sridevi, Jayachitra, Gummadi, Murali Mohan, Kaikala Satyanarayana and Mohan Babu in the main roles. The film released on 28 March 1980 was produced by renowned film producer D. Ramanaidu under Suresh Productions and had musical score by K. Chakravarthy. The film was a commercial success.

Cast 
 Sobhan Babu
 Sridevi
 Jayachitra
 Murali Mohan
 Gummadi
 Kaikala Satyanarayana
 Mohan Babu
 Ranganath
 Allu Ramalingaiah
 Prabhakara Reddy
 Giribabu
 K. V. Chalam
 Jamuna
 Rama Prabha
 P. R. Varalakshmi
 CID Shakunthala
 Leela
 Baby Gowri

Soundtrack 
K. Chakravarthy scored and composed the film's six tracks comprising soundtrack album.
 "Dushtula Meeda" — S. P. B., Madhavapeddi Ramesh, P. Susheela
 "Orabba Olamma" — Anand, S. P. B., P. Susheela, S. P. Sailaja, Madhavapeddi Ramesh, K. Chakravarthy
 "Kandireegato Cheppanura" — S. P. B., P. Susheela
 "Bugga Meeda Muddu" — S. P. B., P. Susheela
 "Isalakidi" — P. Susheela
 "Naa Manasu" — Anand, S. Janaki

References

External links 
 

1980 films
Indian action films
Films scored by K. Chakravarthy
1980 action films
Suresh Productions films